Municipal and school board elections were held in the Canadian province of Nova Scotia on October 15, 2016. Here is a summary of the mayoral results in the major communities in the province and the council results for the four largest municipalities.

Amherst

Bridgewater

Cape Breton Regional Municipality

Cape Breton Regional Council

Colchester County

Colchester County Municipal Council

District 9 special election
Held on October 21, 2017.

Halifax Regional Municipality

Kentville

Kings County
Kings County will be holding mayoral elections for the first time, in addition to elections for municipal council.

Kings County Municipal Council

District of the Municipality of Lunenburg

New Glasgow

Region of Queens Municipality

Truro

Yarmouth (Town)

References

External links
Government of Nova Scotia: Municipal elections

2016
2016 elections in Canada
2016 in Nova Scotia
October 2016 events in Canada